"Rainbow Stew" is a song written and recorded live by American country music artist Merle Haggard backed by The Strangers. It was released in June 1981 as the lead single from the live album Rainbow Stew Live at Anaheim Stadium.  The song reached #4 on the Billboard Hot Country Singles & Tracks chart.

Chart performance

References

1981 singles
1981 songs
Merle Haggard songs
Songs written by Merle Haggard
MCA Records singles